"Lucky" is a song by American singer Britney Spears from her second studio album, Oops!... I Did It Again (2000). It was released on July 25, 2000, by Jive Records as the second single from the album. After meeting with producers Max Martin and Rami Yacoub in Sweden, the singer recorded numerous songs for the album, including "Lucky". The song's narrative follows the story of the eponymous famous actress, who, despite seemingly having it all – fame, wealth, beauty – is truly lonely and unhappy on the inside. It received critical acclaim, with critics praising its melody and rhythm, and Spears' vocals.

"Lucky" became a global success, topping the charts in Austria, Germany, Sweden and Switzerland, while reaching the top ten in several other regions. In the United Kingdom, the song peaked at number five, and is Spears' tenth best-selling single in the country, having sold over 225,000 copies. It also peaked at number 23 on the Billboard Hot 100 in the United States. An accompanying music video was directed by Dave Meyers, and portrays Spears as herself and a melancholy movie star Lucky, who just wants to have some fun in life. Spears has performed "Lucky" in a number of live appearances and in three of her concert tours.

Background and composition

In 1999, Spears began work on her second studio album Oops!... I Did It Again (2000), in Sweden and Switzerland. After meeting with Max Martin and Rami Yacoub in Sweden, Spears recorded several songs for the album, including "Lucky", which was co-written and co-produced by Martin and Rami, with additional co-writing from Alexander Kronlund. Upon returning to America, the singer revealed in an interview with MTV News that: "I just got back from Sweden, and did half [of] the material [for Oops!] over there. I was really, really happy with the material, but we had [such] limited time to get so much done. So I've just really been in the studio nonstop, which is cool, though." Spears recorded her vocals for the song, the first week of November 1999 at Cheiron Studios in Stockholm, Sweden. "Lucky" was released on August 8, 2000, as the second single from the album.

"Lucky" is a song that lasts for three minutes and 24 seconds. According to the digital music sheet published at Musicnotes.com, the song is composed in the key of D major (but will later modulate to E major at the end of the bridge) and is set in the time signature of common time with a moderate tempo of 95 beats per minute, while Spears' vocal range spans over an octave, from A3 to E5. "Lucky" has a basic sequence of D–Bm–G–A as its chord progression. David Veitch of the Calgary Sun and Chuck Taylor of Billboard compared the song's rhythm to the ones of Spears' previous singles "...Baby One More Time" (1998) and "Sometimes" (1999). Lyrically, Spears tells "a story about a girl named Lucky," who is a famous pop star that, despite having all that she wants, still feels lonely inside. Veitch also commented that the lyrics actually refer to Spears' life.

Critical response
"Lucky" received acclaim from music critics. A review by the NME staff explained that "Lucky" is "perhaps Britney's finest moment. The ultimate mallrat, bittersweet teenage symphony". They considered the song  Spears' version of "Where Did It All Go Wrong?" by English rock band Oasis, and went to describe it as "a heart-rending tale of life at the top of the teen pop tree, transformed into an anthem for dramatic, moody 12-year-old girls everywhere by Max Martin's scary talent for teenybop lyrics". However, it was noted that some of the lyrics "sounds pretty heavy when you've just been dumped and Britney's Mickey Mouse Club-trained falsetto is reaching its peak". David Veitch of Calgary Sun called "Lucky" a "sweetly melodic mid-tempo song" and regarding the lyrics commented, "We feel her pain", Billboard magazine contributor Chuck Taylor praised "Lucky" and featured the song on the Spolight column of his Singles Review section. Taylor said that: "its contagious melody, bang-in-your-brain hook, the empathetic theme of a girl who's the world biggest superstar and yet feels all alone (hmm...) will make it an easy sell to top 40 radio and to her grand legion of dedicated fans".

Rolling Stone called it "one of her most bubbly tunes, but the lyrics about a miserable starlet suggest that she identified with the dark side of fame very early on in her career". Gay Times Daniel Megarry felt that "the bittersweet 'Lucky', which almost feels autobiographical, remains the ultimate throwback for 90s kids". The staff from Entertainment Weekly placed it at number 10 on their ranking of Spears's songs and said that "given everything we know about Spears’ past decade, it's hard not to hear 'Lucky' as a haunting premonition packaged in fairy dust". Erin Strecker, from Billboard, called it "one of the pop princess' great ballads", and "undoubtedly one of the high points of Britney Spears' career". Writing for Pink News, Mayer Nissim called it a "a ‘60s-infused self-reflective bit of pop", but pointed out that "there’s a real sense of genuine emotion Spears gets across with some neat vocal flourishes". For Christopher Rosa from Glamour, it's Spears' fifth best song, as well as a "perfect blend of the sweet-pop sound from her first record and lyrics that feel just a little more grown-up". Bustles Alex Kristelis explained that the song's "bubblegum pop gloss disguises even its most devastating lyrics".

Chart performance
In the United States, "Lucky" peaked at number 23 on the Billboard Hot 100 and number 9 on the Top 40 Mainstream chart. It also peaked at number 39 on the Hot Dance Music/Maxi-Singles Sales component chart, and number 14 on Rhythmic Top 40. "Lucky" also achieved commercial success worldwide, reaching number 1 in Austria, Europe, Sweden and Switzerland, while reaching the top 10 in several European countries. On the week of August 28, 2000, "Lucky" debuted at number 5 in the Official Charts Company from the United Kingdom, falling to number 6 in the following week. According to the Official Charts Company, it is her tenth best-selling single in the country, having sold over 225,000 copies there. In Australia, the song peaked at number 3, and was later certified platinum by the Australian Recording Industry Association (ARIA), for shipments of more than 70,000 units of the single. In Germany, the song reached number 1 on the Media Control Charts, being certified gold by the Bundesverband Musikindustrie (BVMI) for shipping over 250,000 units of the single.

Music video
Jive Records commissioned a music video for "Lucky" to be directed by Dave Meyers. It was shot on June 12 and 13, 2000, at the Ren-Mar Studios in Hollywood, California, and premiered on July 13, 2000. According to Jocelyn Vena of MTV, Spears portrays "a melancholy movie star who wants nothing more than to have a little fun".

The video begins with Spears telling a story about a very famous Hollywood actress named Lucky, played by Spears herself. Lucky is seen wearing a pink nightgown behind the curtains, standing on her billboard with fluffy white cotton balls attached to the edges, inside her mansion and shots of her out on the balcony. As beautiful and rich as she is, on set she sits on the star-shape in the sky, as she is acting, she is looking quite distressed. After the first chorus, she goes to the hotel mansion to the flowers, then she leaves and sits down and gets a mirror. Next, Lucky opens the door to reveal a handsome man, who then takes her in his arms, as the director yells "Cut! We've got it". Lucky then walks off-set into the studio, replying to the director: "Finally! We've done it fifty-million times!" She then goes to have her hair and makeup done; with Spears standing unnoticed and very worried looking by her side. Lucky is then seen in a shiny silver evening gown at the Oscars accepting her Academy Award for Best Actress. Lucky looks happy as she accepts it and smiles at her fans but is soon revealed that this is not true happiness. She makes her way away from her screaming fans and back into her limo, where she unexpectedly finds an ornate hand mirror that was used on the film set. She looks back to the crowd to see who has left it and sees Spears leaning forward in the crowd. The limo drives away, leaving Spears behind on the red carpet. The video ends with Lucky crying herself to sleep, her makeup already stained on her face. The curtains close, ending the video.

A Billboard staff reviewer noted that the story "turned out to be less than pure fiction when the singer later went through personal problems in the very public eye." Jarett Wieselman of the New York Post rated the video a C+ and said: "Britney's first Hollywood cautionary tale video didn't seem quite as telling at the time, but with a little distance, the lyrics and concept seem so much sadder". A writer of Rolling Stone explained that "Lucky" is best known for "being the first Spears video to focus on what would become a recurring theme: her conflicted relationship to fame".

Live performances and cover version
Spears performed "Lucky" for the first time on the opening date of her Oops!... I Did It Again Tour, in Columbia, Maryland, on June 20, 2000. The performance of the song featured a navy theme. The track was also on the Dream Within a Dream Tour (2001–02), where Spears emerged from the middle of a giant music box on the stage as a ballerina, to perform the song in a medley with "Born to Make You Happy" and "Sometimes", right after the performance of "Overprotected". Spears also performed the song on several television appearances, including Top of the Pops Germany in 2000, and NBC's Today. "Lucky" was included on the setlist of the Britney: Piece of Me, Spears' Las Vegas residency show (2013–16).

American singer-songwriter Taylor Swift performed the song on her Speak Now World Tour on September 20, 2011, located in Louisiana, as a tribute to Spears. Wearing her signature lilac dress, Swift started to play the first chords of "Lucky" on her guitar, while singing, "Early morning/She wakes up/With a knock, knock, knock on the door/It's time for makeup/Perfect smile/It's you they're all waiting for." Scott Shetler of Pop Crush explained that "the crowd energy for the Britney cover didn't seem as high as when Swift covered Eminem in Detroit or Justin Bieber in Toronto." Jenna Hally Rubenstein of MTV, however, praised the performance, and noted that the show's crowd gave a positive reaction to the cover, saying, "though the video is sideways and features the amateur videographer's own personal sing-along, the excitement in her voice is a testament to Taylor's song choice. Or in other words, we can almost guarantee that every normal, living, breathing Louisiana-bred girl in attendance at Taylor's show is also obsessed with Britney Spears." Becky Bain of Idolator explained that she had no doubts that Swift would cover a Spears song, but was surprised that the song Swift chose was "Lucky". PopDust writer Katherine St Asaph explained that "Lucky" is "one of the few Britney lyrics that could just as easily be written for/by Taylor and one of the few songs that wouldn’t need massive re-arranging."

Track listings

 European CD single
 "Lucky" (Album Version) – 3:24
 "Heart" – 3:00

 European CD maxi single
 "Lucky" (Album Version) – 3:24
 "Heart" – 3:00
 "Lucky" (Jack D. Elliot Radio Mix) – 3:26

 Australian CD maxi single (Part 1)
 "Lucky" (Album Version) – 3:24
 "Heart" – 3:00
 "Lucky" (Jack D. Elliot Radio Mix) – 3:26
 "Oops!... I Did It Again" (Jack D. Elliot Club Mix) – 6:24

 Australian CD maxi single (Part 2)
 "Lucky" (Album Version) – 3:24
 "Oops!... I Did It Again" (Rodney Jerkins Remix) – 3:07
 "Oops!... I Did It Again" (Ospina's Crossover Mix) – 3:15
 "Lucky" (Jason Nevins Mixshow Edit) – 5:51
 "Lucky" (Riprock and Alex G. Radio Edit) – 3:58
 "Oops!... I Did It Again" (Enhanced Video) – 4:12

 Japanese CD maxi single
 "Lucky" (Album Version) – 3:24
 "Lucky" (Jack D. Elliot Radio Mix) – 3:26
 "Oops!... I Did It Again" (Ospina's Crossover Mix) – 3:15
 "Oops!... I Did It Again" (Riprock 'n' Alex G. Oops! We Remixed Again! Radio Mix) – 3:54

 Australian cassette single
 "Lucky" (Album Version) – 3:24
 "Lucky" (Jack D. Elliot Radio Mix) – 3:26
 "Oops!... I Did It Again" (Jack D. Elliot Club Mix) – 6:24

 European cassette single
 "Lucky" (Album Version) – 3:24
 "Heart" – 3:00
 "Oops!... I Did It Again" (Jack D. Elliot Club Mix) – 6:24

 12-inch vinyl
 "Lucky" (Jack D. Elliot Club Mix) – 6:42
 "Lucky" (Album Version) – 3:25
 "Lucky" (Jack D. Elliot Radio Mix) – 3:27
 "Lucky" (Riprock 'n' Alex G. Extended Club Mix) – 7:16
 "Lucky" (Jason Nevins Mixshow Edit) – 5:51

Credits and personnel
 Britney Spears – lead vocals
 Max Martin – production, songwriting, audio mixing, keyboards, programming, background vocals
 Rami Yacoub – production, songwriting, keyboards
 Nana Hedin – background vocals
 Alexander Kronlund – songwriting
 Esbjörn Öhrwall – guitar
 Tom Coyne – audio mastering
Source:

Charts

Weekly charts

Year-end charts

Certifications and sales

Release history

References

2000 singles
2000 songs
2000s ballads
Britney Spears songs
European Hot 100 Singles number-one singles
Jive Records singles
Music videos directed by Dave Meyers (director)
Number-one singles in Austria
Number-one singles in the Czech Republic
Number-one singles in Germany
Number-one singles in Sweden
Number-one singles in Switzerland
Pop ballads
Song recordings produced by Max Martin
Songs about actors
Songs about fictional female characters
Songs about loneliness
Songs written by Alexander Kronlund
Songs written by Max Martin
Songs written by Rami Yacoub
UK Independent Singles Chart number-one singles
Teen pop
Bubblegum pop songs
Music videos shot in the United States
Songs about fame